GlobeNewswire provides press release distribution services globally, with substantial operations in North America and Europe.

GlobeNewswire was a Nasdaq, Inc. subsidiary from September 2006 until April 2018 when West Corporation (now Intrado) acquired the Public Relations Solutions and Digital Media Services Businesses, including GlobeNewswire, from Nasdaq.

Formerly known as PrimeNewswire, the company changed its name to GlobeNewswire in 2008 to better reflect its international scope.

Operations
They deliver corporate press releases, financial disclosures and multimedia content to the media, investment community, individual investors and the public.

In June 2018, GlobeNewswire introduced Media Snippets, providing the ability for organizations publishing press releases to embed a carousel of images, audio, video and live streaming into their press releases and web pages to tell a more complete brand story and increase engagement with media, investors and customers.

In 2012, GlobeNewswire introduced its Streaming Media Player, which allows users to alternate between videos and slides while monitoring a variety of news sources.

In September 2021, GlobeNewswire published an unconfirmed fake news article that Walmart will accept Litecoin LTC payments. As a result, millions of dollars in crypto exchanges were liquidated. Shortly thereafter, the article was deleted, but the damage had already been done. The article was primarily launched by a possibly hacked LiteCoin Twitter account; alternatively, active assistance to manipulate the market is also conceivable.

See also

 List of press release agencies
 List of California companies
 List of news agencies

References

External links
Official Website

Companies based in Los Angeles
Mass media companies established in 1998
Nasdaq, Inc.
Press release agencies
Public relations companies of the United States
News agencies based in the United States